Çesk Zadeja (8 June 1927, Shkodër – 15 August 1997, Rome) was an Albanian composer.  A native of Shkodër, he studied in Moscow and did much to promote the arts in Tirana. He is known as "The Father of Albanian Music". 

He died in Rome, Italy on 15 August 1997.

Discography
Kenge, Albanian Piano Music, Vol. 1, Kirsten Johnson, piano, Guild GMCD 7257, which includes Zadeja's Four Pieces for Piano.
Rapsodi, Albanian Piano Music, Vol. 2, Kirsten Johnson, piano, Guild GMCD 7300, which includes Zadeja's Theme and Variations in E minor and Toccata.

References

Further reading
Leotsakos, George. 2001. "Zadeja, Çesk [Françesk]". The New Grove Dictionary of Music and Musicians, second edition, edited by Stanley Sadie and John Tyrrell. London: Macmillan Publishers.

External links
 

1927 births
1997 deaths
Albanian composers
Male composers
Merited Artists of Albania
Musicians from Shkodër
People's Artists of Albania
20th-century composers
Albanian Roman Catholics
20th-century male musicians